The former Reggie Harrison (born January 9, 1951) is a former professional American football running back for four seasons in the National Football League (NFL) for the Pittsburgh Steelers and St. Louis Cardinals.  In 2000, he changed his name to Kamal Ali Salaam-El in an effort to embrace his Moorish heritage.

Career highlights
He is best remembered for blocking Mitch Hoopes' punt in the fourth quarter Super Bowl X against the Dallas Cowboys.  The ball went through the end zone for a safety, cutting the Cowboy lead to 10-9.  The Steelers went on to win 21-17.  He is also well known for being the road roommate of Frenchy Fuqua during his career with the Steelers.  The two remain close friends to this day.

Harrison was one of the Steelers' two healthy running backs (along with Fuqua) when the team met the Oakland Raiders in the 1976 AFC Championship game.  He ran for 44 yards and a touchdown as the Steelers lost to the Raiders 24-7.

Harrison grew up in Arlington, Virginia, where he starred as a running back for Washington-Lee High School. In the final traditional "Old Oaken Bucket" game against Alexandria, Virginia rival George Washington High School, he scored six touchdowns. Graduating in 1969, he played at the University of Cincinnati before being drafted by the NFL in 1974.

References
Pittsburgh Post Gazette, October 29, 2013, "'Their Life's Work': The game's impact on the 1970s Steelers' bodies and brains"
Falls Church News-Press, Aug. 29, 2012, "Our Man in Arlington", column by Charlie Clark.

1951 births
Living people
Sportspeople from Somerville, New Jersey
American football running backs
Cincinnati Bearcats football players
Pittsburgh Steelers players
St. Louis Cardinals (football) players